Yesha Nicole Therese Camille (born June 26, 2009) is a Filipina child star social media personality and actress. She was the grand winner of I-Shine Talent Camp's second Season in 2013. Her first teleserye is Hawak-Kamay together with Piolo Pascual, Zaijian Jaranilla, Xyriel Manabat and Andrea Brillantes.

Filmography

Notes

References

Living people
Filipino child actresses
ABS-CBN personalities
Star Magic
2009 births
Actresses from Manila
People from Tagum